Das verratene Meer (The Betrayed Sea) is an opera in two parts and 14 scenes, with music by Hans Werner Henze to a German libretto by Hans-Ulrich Treichel, after Yukio Mishima's novel The Sailor Who Fell from Grace with the Sea. Composed between 1986 and 1989, it was Henze's ninth opera, his third that he wrote for the Deutsche Oper Berlin.

Performance history
It was first performed at the Deutsche Oper Berlin on 5 May 1990, when it was conducted by Markus Stenz and produced by Götz Friedrich. The US premiere was at San Francisco Opera on 8 November 1991.

Roles

Synopsis
Part I: Summer
 Scene 1 – Fusako's house
 Scene 2 – An abandoned warehouse
 Scene 3 – A park on a hill above the sea
 Scene 4 – Fusako's house
 Scene 5 – The warehouse
 Scene 6 – The park
 Scene 7 – On the pier in the harbour
 Scene 8 – The warehouse

Part II: Winter
 Scene 9 – The park
 Scene 10 – The warehouse
 Scene 11 – Fusako's house
 Scene 12 – The warehouse
 Scene 13 – Fusako's boutique
 Scene 14 – The warehouse

Recordings
 2006: Gerd Albrecht conducting a Japanese cast (including Mari Midorkawa as Fusako Kuroda; Tsuyoshi Mihara as Ryuji Tsukazaki) and the RAI National Symphony Orchestra for the Salzburg Festival (live recording 26 August 2006) 2 CDs, Orfeo C794 092 I

References

External links
 San Francisco Opera page on Das verratene Meer

Operas
German-language operas
Operas by Hans Werner Henze
1990 operas
Operas set in Japan
Operas based on novels
Yukio Mishima
Japan in non-Japanese culture